Carlos Santana Ávila  is a corregimiento in Santiago District, Veraguas Province, Panama with a population of 4,059 as of 2010. It was created by Law 53 of November 22, 2002.

References

Corregimientos of Veraguas Province